North-East Province was an electoral province of the Legislative Council of Western Australia between 1897 and 1965. It elected three members throughout its existence.

Members

References
 David Black (2014), The Western Australian Parliamentary Handbook (Twenty-Third Edition), pp. 221–222

Former electoral provinces of Western Australia
1897 establishments in Australia
1965 disestablishments in Australia